Balladeer or The Balladeer may refer to:

 Balladeer, a singer or reciter of ballads
 A Balladeer, a Dutch musical group
Balladeer (Frankie Laine album)
The Balladeer, a character in TV series The Dukes of Hazzard voiced  by Waylon Jennings
The Balladeer, a compilation album by Waylon Jennings
The Balladeer (album), a 2020 album by Lori McKenna
Queen City Balladeers
Balladeer, 6th Fatui Harbinger “Scaramouche” in the video game Genshin Impact.